Miroslav Táborský (born 9 November 1959 in Prague, Czechoslovakia) is a Czech actor who has appeared on Czech television series, as well as in American movies.

Táborský studied physics at the University of Hradec Králové, and then graduated from the Theatre Faculty of the Academy of Performing Arts in Prague (DAMU) in 1987. Táborský has received both an Alfréd Radok Award (1997) and a Goya Award (1998, Category Best New Actor, La niña de tus ojos). He is also known as the voice actor for Holly in the Czech dub of Red Dwarf.

Filmography
Barefoot (2017)
Stuck with a Perfect Woman (2016)
Goat Story with Cheese 2012 – 3D animated movie
Borgia (2011) – Cardinal Gianbattista Orsini
2Bobule (2009)
Goat Story – The Old Prague Legends 2008 – 3D animated movie
Grapes (2008)
The Dresser by Ronald Harwood, Divadlo v Dlouhé theatre (2002) – The Dresser
Twelfth Night, or What You Will, Summer Shakespeare Festival at Prague Castle (2005) – Feste
Close to Heaven (2005)
Hostel (2005)
The Brothers Grimm (2005)
Jak básníci neztrácejí naději (2004)
Eurotrip (2004)
Tmavomodrý svět (2001)
Frank Herbert's Dune (2000, miniseries) – Count Hasimir Fenring
La niña de tus ojos (1998) – interpreter Václav Passer – Goya Award for Best New Actor
Snow White: A Tale of Terror (1997)
Lotrando a Zubejda (1996)

References

External links

1959 births
Living people
Czech male television actors
Czech male film actors
Czech male voice actors
Male actors from Prague
Academy of Performing Arts in Prague alumni
20th-century Czech male actors
21st-century Czech male actors